The Ball State Cardinals football program is a college football team that represents Ball State University in the Mid-American Conference a part of the NCAA Division I Football Bowl Subdivision. In nearly a century of play in college football over four affiliations (Indiana Collegiate Conference, Independent, Conference of Midwestern Universities, and the MAC), the Cardinals have had sixteen head coaches.

Key

Coaches
Statistics correct as of the end of the 2022 college football season.

Notes

References
 
 

Lists of college football head coaches

Indiana sports-related lists